South Boston Speedway, or "SoBo", is a short track located just outside South Boston, Virginia. It is owned by Mattco, Inc., the Mattioli family trust that owns Pocono Raceway, with general manager Chase Brashears operating the track, replacing Cathy Rice who retired in 2021 after serving in that role for 21 years. NASCAR's three national series have raced at the track, though the Cup Series has not done so since 1971, while the Busch Series last raced here in 2000. After the Busch Series left the schedule, the Craftsman Truck Series competed at SoBo for a few years between 2001 and 2003. The SRX Series visited the track in 2022.

Like most tracks in the region it is NASCAR sanctioned therefore drivers can run for NASCAR Advance Auto Parts Weekly Series National Points, the track has produced most of the national champions in the past two decades. The track holds around 12 events annually for its local racing divisions which includes the Late Model Stock Cars, Budweiser Limited Sportsman, Southside Disposal Pure Stock, and the VSP Heat Hornets. The East Coast Flathead Ford Racing Association and the Southern Ground Pounders Vintage Racing Club make select appearances. In 2022 the track introduced a new division, the Mills Family Practice Champ Karts that quickly gained popularity. USAC Eastern Midgets ran a couple of races in 2022. All events in 2022, except for SRX, were broadcast live on FloRacing

The track has historically been known for its modified racing, The original SMART Modified Tour ran at the track in 1992-93 and 2001 its successor, the NASCAR Whelen Southern Modified Tour, ran annually from 2009 to 2013 and biannually from 2014 to 2016, the reincarnation of the SMART Modified Tour has ran a race since 2021. The NASCAR Whelen Modified Tour has run twice at the track, in 2001 and 2019, the NWMT was scheduled to return for a third time in 2020 but the race was canceled due to the COVID-19 Pandemic.

The ARCA Menards Series has held 3 races at South Boston from 2002 until 2004. The facility also hosted 11 NASCAR Southeast Series races from 1992 to 2006. The ARCA Menards Series East (then NASCAR K&N Pro Series East) replaced the Southeast Series at the track for the next five years and returned in 2017 for twin 100 lap races that continued into 2019.

South Boston in recent years has been known for its Late Model Stock racing. The Thunder Road Harley-Davidson 200 is SoBo's Crown Jewel race,  held annually on Independence Day weekend, and is the first race in the Virginia Triple Crown. The CARS Pro Late Model Tour and CARS Late Model Stock Tour has held multiple events at the speedway including a stretch of 21 events from 1997 to 2011 (as the CARS X1-R Pro Cup Series) and has made an annual stop since 2017. In 2014 and 2015 the track held the Denny Hamlin Short Track Showdown. The ASA National Tour hosted 2 races at SoBo—one in 2001 and the other in 2002.

Some of the better known graduates of South Boston's Saturday night weekly events include Jeff Burton, Ward Burton, Elliott Sadler, Stacy Compton, and the Bodine brothers (Todd, Geoff and Brett). Danville, Virginia driver Wendell Scott, the first African-American driver to compete at NASCAR's highest level, also raced in Modified Division events there.

Notable drivers
Throughout the years, South Boston Speedway has been a popular venue where a number of NASCAR's greatest stars visited and raced, and new stars were born.

Dale Earnhardt, Dale Earnhardt Jr., Cale Yarborough, Darrell Waltrip, Terry Labonte, Geoff Bodine, Bobby Allison, Tony Stewart, Ken Schrader, and Benny Parsons are among many Cup Series drivers that have competed at South Boston Speedway over the years. Parsons scored his first career Grand National win at South Boston Speedway when the track hosted its last Grand National race in 1971.

Waltrip was a winner at South Boston Speedway while competing in NASCAR Late Model Sportsman races. Bodine cut his teeth in racing full bodied stock cars when he came South off of the NASCAR Modified circuit in 1981 to drive for Emanuel Zervakis of Richmond. The former NASCAR Modified driver won nine of 11 NASCAR Late Model Sportsman events and went on to win the South Boston Speedway title that season. He used that experience to vault his way onto the NASCAR Winston Cup Series tour.

In the early 1970s when the NASCAR Grand American Series was popular, drivers such as Tiny Lund, Pete Hamilton, Jim Paschal, Frank Sessoms, and T. C. Hunt competed on the South Boston Speedway oval.

Ray Hendrick, a legendary driver known for his hard charging driving style, recorded hundreds of wins at the South Boston Speedway during his storied career, many of them coming when he was piloting the famous winged No. 11 Modified coupe that was fielded by Jack Tant and Clayton Mitchell. The Richmond, Virginia resident won five track championships at the South Boston Speedway, four of them while competing in the NASCAR Modified division, and one in the NASCAR Late Model Sportsman division.

Over the years, South Boston Speedway has been a breeding ground for a number of NASCAR stars. South Boston natives Jeff Burton and Ward Burton spent their early careers in the NASCAR Late Model Stock Car Division there. The Burtons are the only brothers to win the South Boston Speedway Most Popular Driver Award.

South Boston Speedway's 1994 champion, Stacy Compton, went on to a successful career, competing in the Cup Series, Busch, and Craftsman Truck Series.

Hermie Sadler and Elliott Sadler of Emporia, Virginia competed in Late Models at South Boston Speedway, with Elliott winning the track championship as a 20-year-old rising star. Cup Series star Denny Hamlin also raced and won multiple times in the Late Model Stock Car Division.

David Blankenship of Moseley, Virginia has the most track championships. In 1998, he won an unprecedented seventh career South Boston Speedway NASCAR Late Model Stock Car Division title. Hendrick's mark of five South Boston Speedway championships is second to Blankenship's seven titles. In 2019, Peyton Sellers of Danville, Virginia won his fifth career South Boston Speedway NASCAR Late Model Stock Car Division title to move into a tie with Hendrick for second place.

Records
 Track record – Tommy Catalano (13.849 seconds; 103.979  MPH); NASCAR Whelen Modified
 Race record – Todd Bodine, 70.785 MPH
Late Model Stock Car Track Record—Peyton Sellers (14.676 seconds; 98.119 MPH; March 16, 2019) 
Limited Track Record—Colin Garrett (15.125 seconds; 97.587 MPH; April 8, 2017)
Pure Stock Track Record—Nathan Crews (17.678 seconds; 81.457 MPH; Aug. 24, 2019)
NASCAR K&N Pro Series East (now ARCA Menards Series East) Track Record—Chase Cabre (14.711 seconds; 97.886 MPH; April 5, 2017)

Late Model Track Champions

See also
 List of NASCAR race tracks
 Winston Racing Series
 Barry Beggarly

References

External links
 South Boston Speedway Official Site
 NASCAR Grand National/Winston Cup and Busch Series winners list
South Boston Speedway race results at Racing-Reference

Motorsport venues in Virginia
NASCAR tracks
ARCA Menards Series tracks
Buildings and structures in Halifax County, Virginia
Tourist attractions in Halifax County, Virginia
1957 establishments in Virginia
Sports venues completed in 1957